Thrill ride or Thrill Ride may refer to
Amusement ride
3-D Ultra Pinball: Thrill Ride
Thrill Ride, the 4th book in The Hardy Boys Undercover Brothers series.
Roller coaster
Thrill Ride (film)